Atomic blonde may refer to:

 Platinum blonde hair
 Blonde bombshell (stereotype)
 Atomic Blonde, a 2017 spy film starring Charlize Theron
 The Coldest City (2012 comic) comic book the film is based on, referred to also as "Atomic Blonde" after the film tie-in edition
 Atomic Blonde, a 1963 pulp fiction novel by Monte Steele, published by Playtime PBO.

See also
 Atomic (song), 1979 song by Blondie
 Atomic: The Very Best of Blondie (1998 album)
 Platinum Blonde (disambiguation)
 Atomic (disambiguation)
 Blonde (disambiguation)
 Blond (disambiguation)